Thomas Robert Byrne (March 9, 1923 – April 5, 2009) was an American politician in Minnesota. He was the Democratic mayor of Saint Paul from 1966 to 1970. He was Catholic and fully Irish. He served in the U.S. Army Air Force in World War II. He was a member of the American Legion and the Veterans of Foreign Wars.

His brother the Most Reverend James Byrne was an auxiliary bishop in the Roman Catholic Archdiocese of Saint Paul, and later the Archbishop of Dubuque, Iowa. His brother Robert Byrne was an instructor of Latin at Saint Thomas Military Academy, in Saint Paul and later in Mendota Heights, Minnesota.

Notes

Mayors of Saint Paul, Minnesota
Minnesota Democrats
American people of Irish descent
1923 births
2009 deaths
United States Army Air Forces soldiers
United States Army Air Forces personnel of World War II
20th-century American politicians
Catholics from Minnesota